The Millhiser-Baker Farm, in Chaves County, New Mexico near Roswell, New Mexico, was listed on the National Register of Historic Places in 1988.

Gus A. Millhiser of Richmond, Virginia bought the farm in 1893 for his son, Philip, who had tuberculosis.  Its Queen Anne house was built soon after.

References

Ranches in New Mexico
National Register of Historic Places in Chaves County, New Mexico
Queen Anne architecture in New Mexico
Buildings and structures completed in 1893